Qingyuan Jiedushi  (i.e., the Jiedushi of Qingyuan Circuit) was a military/governance administrative unit (circuit) late in China's Five Dynasties and Ten Kingdoms Period, later renamed to Pinghai Jiedushi . It was an office created in 949 by Southern Tang's second emperor Li Jing for the warlord Liu Congxiao, who nominally submitted to him but controlled Quan (泉州, in modern Quanzhou, Fujian) and Zhang (漳州, in modern Zhangzhou, Fujian) Prefectures in de facto independence from the Southern Tang state.  (Zhang Prefecture was, at times during the circuit's existence, also known as Nan Prefecture  Starting in 960, in addition to being nominally submissive to Southern Tang, the Qingyuan Circuit was also nominally submissive to the Song, which had itself become Southern Tang's nominal overlord.

After Liu's death, the circuit was briefly ruled by his biological nephew/adoptive son Liu Shaozi, who was then overthrown by the officers Zhang Hansi and Chen Hongjin.  Zhang then ruled the circuit briefly, before Chen deposed him and took over.  In 978, with Song's determination to unify Chinese lands in full order, Chen decided that he could not stay de facto independent, and offered the control of the circuit to Song's Emperor Taizong, ending Qingyuan Circuit as a de facto independent entity.

Rulers 
 Liu Congxiao 949–962 (in control of Quan since 946, in de facto independence since 947)
 Liu Shaozi 962
 Zhang Hansi 962–963
 Chen Hongjin 963–978

See also 
 Min (Ten Kingdoms)
 Fujian Circuit

Notes and references

External links 
A universal guide for China studies from Chinaknowledge

Five Dynasties and Ten Kingdoms